Stephen Skipsey Hughes (born 19 August 1952, in Sunderland, County Durham) is a British Labour Party politician who served as a Member of the European Parliament (MEP) from 1984 to 2014.

Hughes attended St Bede's School in Lanchester, County Durham, and then Newcastle Polytechnic.  He became a local government officer. Representing the Durham constituency between 1984 and 1999, Hughes was elected to its successor constituency, North East England in 1999 and re-elected in 2004 and 2009. He stood down at the 2014 election. In 1994 he appeared in the Guinness Book of World Records for the biggest majority in an English election.

Hughes was deputy leader of the European Parliamentary Labour Party from 1989 until 1991, and was also the Social Group spokesperson on health and safety and on the working environment.

In 2009 he took 25% of the vote, the highest of the three elected MEPs in the region, and the highest share of the vote for Labour in the UK.

Personal life
He is the father of five children. He plays saxophone in a blues band called the Vast Majorities.

References

External links
Profile at European Parliament website

1952 births
Living people
Alumni of Northumbria University
Labour Party (UK) MEPs
MEPs for England 1984–1989
MEPs for England 1989–1994
MEPs for England 1994–1999
MEPs for England 1999–2004
MEPs for England 2004–2009
MEPs for England 2009–2014
People from Lanchester, County Durham